The huge moth family Noctuidae contains the following genera:

A B C D E F G H I J K L M N O P Q R S T U V W X Y Z

Mabilleana
Macaldenia
Macapta
Macdunnoughia
Macella
Macellopis
Machaeropalpus
Macrhypena
Macristis
Macrocarsia
Macrochilo
Macrodes
Macronoctua
Macroprora
Madathisanotia
Madecathymia
Madegalatha
Madeuplexia
Madoce
Mafana
Magellana
Mageochaeta
Maghadena
Maguda
Magulaba
Magusa
Maguza
Maikona
Makapta
Malagonia
Malatrogia
Maliangia
Maliattha
Maltana
Mamerthes
Mamestra
Mammifrontia
Manbuta
Mandela
Manga
Manoblemma
Manruta
Marapana
Maraschia
Marasmalus
Marathyssa
Marca
Marcillada
Marcipa
Marcipalina
Marcipopsis
Mardara
Maresia
Mareura
Margana
Margasotis
Margelana
Margitesia
Margiza
Margizoides
Marilopteryx
Marimatha
Marmorinia
Marojala
Maronia
Maronis
Marsipiophora
Marthama
Marzigetta
Masalia
Masca
Maschukia
Masebia
Masoga
Massaga
Massala
Massava
Mastigia
Mastigophorus
Mastiphanes
Mastixis
Mataeomera
Matarum
Mathura
Matigramma
Matiloxis
Matopo
Maxera
Maxia
Maxilua
Maxula
Mazacyla
Mazuca
Mecistoptera
Mecodina
Mecodinops
Mecodopsis
Mecynoptera (syn.)
Mecyra
Medlerana
Megacephalomana
Megachyta
Megacronycta
Megaloctena
Megalodes
Megalographa
Megalonycta
Megaloptera
Meganephria
Meganyctycia
Megarhomba
Megasema
Megastopolia
Meghypena
Megistoclisma
Megonychiana
Meizoglossa
Mekrania
Melagramma
Melaleucantha
Melamera
Melanarta
Melanchra
Melanchroiopsis
Melanephia
Melanomma
Melanoplusia
Melapera
Melapia
Melaporphyria
Meliaba
Melicleptria
Melionica
Melipotis
Mellinia
Menada
Menarsia
Mendozania
Menecina
Meneptera
Menopsimus
Mentaxya
Mepantadrea
Meranda
Meridyrias
Meristides
Meristis
Merolonche
Meropis
Meropleon
Mervia
Mesaegle
Mesapamea
Mesasteria
Mesembragrotis
Mesembreosa
Mesembreuxoa
Mesocopsis
Mesocrapex
Mesoeuxoa
Mesogenea
Mesogona
Mesoligia
Mesolomia
Mesophractias
Mesoplectra
Mesoplus
Mesorhynchaglaea
Mesoruza
Mesosciera
Mesotrosta
Mestleta
Metacala
Metacausta
Metachrostis
Metacinia
Metacullia
Metaegle
Metaemene
Metagarista
Metagnorisma
Metahadena
Metalectra
Metalepsis
Metallata
Metalopha
Metaphoenia
Metapioplasta
Metaplusia
Metaponpneumata
Metappana
Metaprionota
Metaprosphera
Metasada
Metasarca
Metatacha
Metaxaglaea
Metaxanthiella
Metaxyja
Metaxyllia
Metecia
Meterana
Methorasa
Metina
Metlaouia
Metopiora
Metopistis
Metopoceras
Metopodicha
Metoponia
Metoponrhis
Metopoplacis
Metopoplus
Metoposcopa
Metopta
Metria
Meyrickella
Micardia
Michelliana
Michera
Micracontia
Micraeschus
Micragrotis
Micramma
Micrantha
Micranthops
Micrapatetis
Micrathetis
Micraxylia
Micreremites
Micriantha
Microcoelia 
Microedma
Microhelia
Microlita
Micromania
Micromonodes
Microphaea
Microphisa (syn.)
Microphta
Microplexia
Microraphe
Microrthosia
Microselene
Microsemyra
Microsyngrapha
Microxyla
Mictochroa
Mila
Militagrotis
Milyas
Mimachrostia
Mimanuga
Mimasura
Mimeugoa
Mimeusemia
Mimleucania
Mimobarathra
Mimophisma
Mimoruza
Minica
Miniodes
Miniophyllodes
Miniphila
Minofala
Minucia
Miodera
Mionides
Miracavira
Miracopa
Miropalpa
Misa
Miselia
Mithila
Mitothemma
Mitrophrys
Mixomelia
Mnesipyrga
Mniopamea
Mniotype
Mocis
Mocrendes
Modunga
Moepa
Molopa
Molvena
Molybdonycta
Molynda
Momophana
Monima
Monobotodes
Monochroides
Monocondica
Monocymia
Monodes
Monogona
Monoptya
Monosca
Monostola
Monoxylena
Monticollia
Mopothila
Mormecia
Mormo
Mormonia
Mormoscopa
Morphopoliana
Morrisonia
Mosara
Mosopia
Motama
Motina
Mouralia
Moureia
Mudaria
Mulelocha
Multsotis
Murgisa
Mursa
Musothyma
Musurgina
Myalila
Myana
Mycterophora
Mycteroplus
Mydrodoxa
Myrtale
Mystomemia
Mystrocephala
Mythimna
Mythymima
Myxinia

References 

 Natural History Museum Lepidoptera genus database

 
Noctuid genera M